The Alexandra may refer to:

 The Alexandra (Cincinnati, Ohio), a building listed on the National Register of Historic Places (NRHP)
 The Alexandra (Indianapolis, Indiana), listed on the NRHP in Indianapolis, Indiana
 The Alexandra, New Barnet, former pub in New Barnet, London, England
The Alexandra, Birmingham, a theatre (established 1901) in Birmingham, England

See also
Alexandra (disambiguation)